The Peep Tempel was a punk rock band from Melbourne, Australia. The band's line-up for most of its tenure was Blake Scott (vocals, guitar), Steven Carter (drums) and Stewart Rayner (bass guitar). The band released three studio albums: The Peep Tempel (2012), Tales (2014) and Joy (2016).

History

2008–2013: formation and The Peep Tempel 
The Peep Tempel was formed in 2008 as a two-piece by singer-songwriter Blake Scott and drummer Steven Carter who were neighbours at the time. As a two-piece, the band recorded in their own home studio and released two 7-inch singles through the imprint Wing Sing.

In late 2011, Stewart Rayner joined the band to play bass guitar and during 2012 the band toured both in Australia and Europe as a three-piece.

In 2011 The Peep Tempel invited Matthew Duffy, who had recorded the band's first two singles along with Clinton Kraus, to join the band to play bass guitar for their debut studio album. The Peep Tempel recorded and released their debut album The Peep Tempel in 2012 through Wing Sing. The Peep Tempel was nominated in the category of Best Independent Hard Rock or Punk Album at the AIR Awards of 2012.

In 2013, the band recorded the EP Modern Professional, which was released through Wing Sing in June 2013.

2014–2017: Tales & Joy
In 2014 the band recorded their second studio album Tales, which was released through Wing Sing in October 2014. Tales was shortlisted for the 2014 Australian Music Prize and nominated in the category of Best Independent Hard Rock, Heavy or Punk Album at the AIR Awards of 2015.

"Carol," a song featured on Tales, was shortlisted for the 2014 Song of the Year APRA Awards (Australia) and nominated in the category of Best Song at the Music Victoria Awards of 2015.

In 2016, The Peep Tempel recorded their third album Joy at Sing Sing Studios with Anna Laverty. The album was released 14 October 2016. The band played their final shows in 2017 before entering an indefinite hiatus.

Since the band's hiatus, Carter and Rayner have formed a new band, Shepparton Airplane. Scott, meanwhile, released his debut solo album Niscitam in October 2020.

Discography

Albums

Extended plays

Awards

AIR Awards
The Australian Independent Record Awards (commonly known informally as AIR Awards) is an annual awards night to recognise, promote and celebrate the success of Australia's Independent Music sector.

|-
| AIR Awards of 2012
|The Peep Tempel 
| Best Independent Hard Rock or Punk Album
| 
|-
| AIR Awards of 2015
| Tales 
| Best Independent Hard Rock or Punk Album
| 
|-

APRA Awards
The APRA Awards are presented annually from 1982 by the Australasian Performing Right Association (APRA), "honouring composers and songwriters". They commenced in 1982.

! 
|-
| 2015 
| "Carol" (Steven Carter, Stewart Rayner & Blake Scott)
| Song of the Year
| 
| 
|-

Australian Music Prize
The Australian Music Prize (the AMP) is an annual award of $30,000 given to an Australian band or solo artist in recognition of the merit of an album released during the year of award. The commenced in 2005.

|-
| 2014
| Tales
| Australian Music Prize
| 
|-
| 2016
| Joy
| Australian Music Prize
| 
|-

Music Victoria Awards
The Music Victoria Awards (previously known as The Age EG Awards and The Age Music Victoria Awards) are an annual awards night celebrating Victorian music.

! 
|-
| rowspan="3"| Music Victoria Awards of 2015
| "Carol"
| Best Song
| 
| rowspan="5"| 
|-
| themselves
| Best Band
| 
|-
| themselves
| Best Live Band
| 
|-
| Music Victoria Awards of 2016
| themselves
| Best Live Band
| 
|-
| Music Victoria Awards of 2017
| themselves
| Best Live Act
| 
|-

References 

Australian indie rock groups
Musical groups from Melbourne